On September 1, 2006, Iran Air Tours Tu-154 aircraft traveling from Bandar Abbas with 11 crew and 137 passengers on board burst into flames upon landing in Mashhad, Iran at 13:45 local time killing 28 of those on board.

Possible causes
The specific cause is not known, however it is believed that the nose gear tire blew on landing.

Aircraft
The aircraft had been in active service since 1988 and had approximately 19,000 hours of flight time over about 2,200 flights.  It was originally owned by Aeroflot. The plane was leased by Iran Air Tours in August 2005 after having been operated by a number of other carriers.

References

2006 in Iran
Aviation accidents and incidents in Iran
Aviation accidents and incidents in 2006
Accidental deaths in Iran
Accidents and incidents involving the Tupolev Tu-154
945
September 2006 events in Asia